Afrocentrism is an approach to the study of world history that focuses on the history of people of recent African descent. It is in some respects a response to Eurocentric attitudes about African people and their historical contributions. It seeks to counter what it sees as mistakes and ideas perpetuated by the racist philosophical underpinnings of Western academic disciplines as they developed during and since Europe's Early Renaissance as justifying rationales for the enslavement of other peoples, in order to enable more accurate accounts of not only African but all people's contributions to world history. Afrocentricity deals primarily with self-determination and African agency and is a pan-African point of view for the study of culture, philosophy, and history.

Afrocentrism is a scholarly movement that seeks to conduct research and education on global history subjects, from the perspective of historical African peoples and polities. It takes a critical stance on Eurocentric assumptions and myths about world history, in order to pursue methodological studies of the latter. Some of the critics of the movement believe that it often denies or minimizes European, Near Eastern, and Asian cultural influences while exaggerating certain aspects of historical African civilizations that independently accomplished a significant level of cultural and technological development. In general, Afrocentrism is usually manifested in a focus on the history of Africa and its role in contemporary African-American culture among others.

What is today broadly called Afrocentrism evolved out of the work of African American intellectuals in the late nineteenth and early twentieth centuries, but flowered into its modern form due to the activism of African American intellectuals in the U.S. civil rights movement and in the development of African American studies programs in universities. However, following the development of universities in African colonies in the 1950s, African scholars became major contributors to African historiography. A notable pioneer is the professor Kenneth Dike, who became chairman of the Committee on African Studies at Harvard in the 1970s. In strict terms Afrocentrism, as a distinct historiography, reached its peak in the 1980s and 1990s. Today it is primarily associated with Cheikh Anta Diop, John Henrik Clarke, Ivan van Sertima and Molefi Kete Asante. Asante, however, describes his theories as Afrocentricity.

Proponents of Afrocentrism support the claim that the contributions of various Black African people have been downplayed or discredited as part of the legacy of colonialism and slavery's pathology of "writing Africans out of history". Major critics of Afrocentrism include Mary Lefkowitz, who dismiss it as pseudohistory, reactive, and obstinately therapeutic. Others, such as Kwame Anthony Appiah, believe that Afrocentrism defeats its purpose of dismantling unipolar studies of world history by seeking to replace Eurocentricity with an equally ethnocentric and hierarchical curriculum, and negatively essentializes European culture and people of European descent. Clarence E. Walker claims it to be "Eurocentrism in blackface".

Terminology
The term "Afrocentrism" dates to 1962. The adjective "Afrocentric" appears in a typescript proposal for an entry in Encyclopedia Africana, possibly due to W. E. B. Du Bois. The abstract noun "Afrocentricity" dates to the 1970s, and was popularized by Molefi Asante's Afrocentricity: The Theory of Social Change (1980). Molefi Kete Asante's theory, Afrocentricity, has been one developed in academic settings and may incorporate the terms Afrocentric to describe scholarship and Afrocentrists to describe scholars, but does not use Afrocentrism. According to Asante, though the two terms are often confused to mean the same, Afrocentrists are not adherents of Afrocentrism.  This has caused confusing notions about who is considered an Afrocentrist, as various scholars who may or may not be associated with Asante and his works have been erroneously given the title, even by other academics. Asante has written that Afrocentricity and Afrocentrism are not the same and neither do they share the same origin:

By way of distinction, Afrocentricity should not be confused with the variant Afrocentrism. The term “Afrocentrism” was first used by the opponents of Afrocentricity who in their zeal saw it as an obverse of Eurocentrism. The adjective “Afrocentric” in the academic literature always referred to “Afrocentricity.” However, the use of “Afrocentrism” reflected a negation of the idea of Afrocentricity as a positive and progressive paradigm. The aim was to assign religious signification to the idea of African centeredness. However, it has come to refer to a broad cultural movement of the late twentieth century that has a set of philosophical, political, and artistic ideas which provides the basis for the musical, sartorial, and aesthetic dimensions of the African personality. On the other hand, Afrocentricity, as I have previously defined it, is a theory of agency, that is, the idea that African people must be viewed and view themselves as agents rather than spectators to historical revolution and change. To this end Afrocentricity seeks to examine every aspect of the subject place of Africans in historical, literary, architectural, ethical, philosophical, economic, and political life.

History

Afrocentrism has its origins in the work of African and African diaspora intellectuals in the late 19th and early 20th centuries, following social changes in the United States and Africa due both to the end of slavery and the decline of colonialism. Following the American Civil War, African Americans in the South gathered together in communities to evade white control, established their own church congregations, and worked hard to gain education. They increasingly took more active public roles despite severe racial discrimination and segregation. American and African intellectuals looked to the African past for a re-evaluation of what its civilizations had achieved and what they meant for contemporary people.

As an ideology and political movement, Afrocentrism had its beginnings in activism among black intellectuals, political figures, and historians in the context of the US American civil rights movement. According to U.S. professor Victor Oguejiofor Okafor, concepts of Afrocentricity lie at the core of disciplines such as African American studies. But Wilson J. Moses claims that Afrocentrism roots are not exclusively African:

In 1987, Martin Bernal published his Black Athena, in which he claims that ancient Greece was colonized by northern invaders mixing with a colony established by Phoenicia (modern Lebanon). A major theme of the work is the alleged denial by Western academia of the African and (western) Asiatic influence on ancient Greek culture.

Aspects of Afrocentricity and Afrocentrism

Afrocentricity book

In 2000, African American Studies professor Molefi Kete Asante, gave a lecture entitled "Afrocentricity: Toward a New Understanding of African Thought in this Millennium," in which he presented many of his ideas:
 Africa has been betrayed by international commerce, by missionaries and imams, by the structure of knowledge imposed by the Western world, by its own leaders, and by the ignorance of its own people of its past.
 Philosophy originated in Africa and the first philosophers in the world were Africans.
 Afrocentricity constitutes a new way of examining data, and a novel orientation to data; it carries with it assumptions about the current state of the African world.
 His aim is "to help lay out a plan for the recovery of African place, respectability, accountability, and leadership."
 Afrocentricity can stand its ground among any ideology or religion: Marxism, Islam, Christianity, Buddhism, or Judaism. Your Afrocentricity will emerge in the presence of these other ideologies because it is from you.
 Afrocentrism is the only ideology that can liberate African people.

Asante also stated:

However, Wilson J. Moses, said of Asante: "His second book, The Afrocentric Idea (1987), was a creative and in some respects brilliant but rambling theoretical work, much influenced by the revolution in "critical theory" that occurred in American intellectual life during the late 1970s and early 1980s." Some also assert that the definition of Afrocentricity has never sat still long enough to be properly described and accurately critiqued.

Afrocentric education

Afrocentric education is education designed to empower peoples of the African diaspora. A central premise behind it is that many Africans have been subjugated by limiting their awareness of themselves and indoctrinating them with ideas that work against them. To control a people's culture is to control their tools of self-determination in relationship to others. Like educational leaders of other cultures, proponents assert that what educates one group of people does not necessarily educate and empower another group–so they assert educational priorities distinctly for the Africans in a given context.

Afrocentric theology

The black church in the United States developed out of the creolization of African spirituality and European-American Christianity; early members of the churches made certain stories their own. During the antebellum years, the idea of deliverance out of slavery, as in the story of Exodus, was especially important. After Reconstruction and the restoration of white supremacy, their hope was based on deliverance from segregation and other abuses. They found much to respond to in the idea of a personal relationship with Jesus, and shaped their churches by the growth of music and worship styles that related to African as well as European-American traditions.

Twentieth-century "Africentric approaches" to Christian theology and preaching have been more deliberate. Writers and thinkers emphasize "Black presence" in the Christian Bible, including the idea of a "Black Jesus".

Kwanzaa
In 1966 Maulana Karenga of the black separatist US Organization created Kwanzaa; which became the first specifically African American holiday to be widely observed amongst African Americans. Karenga rejected liberation theology and considered the practice of Christianity anti-thetical to the creation of an African-American identity independent from white America. Karenga said his goal was to "give Blacks an alternative to the existing holiday and give Blacks an opportunity to celebrate themselves and history, rather than simply imitate the practice of the dominant society."

Race and Pan-African identity

Many Afrocentrists seek to challenge concepts such as white privilege, color-blind perspectives, and race-neutral pedagogies. There are strong ties between Afrocentricity and Critical race theory.

Afrocentrists agree with the current scientific consensus that holds that Africans exhibit a range of types and physical characteristics, and that such elements as wavy hair or aquiline facial features are part of a continuum of African types that do not depend on admixture with Caucasian groups. They cite work by Hiernaux and Hassan that they believe demonstrates that populations could vary based on micro-evolutionary principles (climate adaptation, drift, selection), and that such variations existed in both living and fossil Africans.

Afrocentrists have condemned what they consider to be attempts at dividing African peoples into racial clusters as new versions of discredited theories, such as the Hamitic hypothesis and the Dynastic Race Theory. These theories, they contend, attempted to identify certain African ethnicities, such as Nubians, Ethiopians and Somalis, as "Caucasoid" groups that entered Africa to bring civilization to the natives. They believe that Western academics have traditionally limited the peoples they defined as "Black" Africans to those south of the Sahara, but used broader "Caucasoid" or related categories to classify peoples of Egypt or North Africa. Afrocentrists also believe strongly in the work of certain anthropologists who have suggested that there is little evidence to support that the first North African populations were closely related to "Caucasoids" of Europe and western Asia.

In 1964 Afrocentric scholar Cheikh Anta Diop expressed a belief in such a double standard:

French historian Jean Vercoutter has claimed that archaeological workers routinely classified Negroid remains as Mediterranean, even though they found such remains in substantial numbers with ancient artefacts.

Some Afrocentrists have adopted a pan-Africanist perspective that people of color are all "African people" or "diasporic Africans," citing physical characteristics they exhibit in common with Black Africans. Afrocentric scholar Runoko Rashidi writes that they are all part of the "global African community." Some Afrocentric writers include in the African diaspora the Dravidians of India, "Negritos" of Southeast Asia (Thailand, the Philippines and Malaysia); and the aboriginal peoples of Australia and Melanesia.

A few Afrocentrists claim that the Olmecs of Mexico were a hybrid society of Native American peoples and Africans. Mainstream historians of Mesoamerica overwhelmingly reject that view with detailed rebuttals.

Pre-Columbian Africa-Americas theories

In the 1970s, Ivan van Sertima advanced the theory that the complex civilizations of the Americas were the result of trans-oceanic influence from the Egyptians or other African civilizations. Such a claim is his primary thesis in They Came Before Columbus, published in 1978. The few hyper-diffusionist writers seek to establish that the Olmec people, who built the first highly complex civilization in Mesoamerica and are considered by some to be the mother civilization for all other civilizations of Mesoamerica, were deeply influenced by Africans. Van Sertima said that the Olmec civilization was a hybrid one of Africans and Native Americans. His theory of pre-Columbian American-African contact has since met with considerable and detailed opposition by scholars of Mesoamerica. Van Sertima has been accused of "doctoring" and twisting data to fit his conclusions, inventing evidence, and ignoring the work of respected Central and South American scholars in the advance of his own theory.

Afrocentrism and Ancient Egypt

Several Afrocentrists have claimed that important cultural characteristics of ancient Egypt were indigenous to Africa and that these features were present in other early African civilizations such as the later Kerma and the Meroitic civilizations of Nubia. Scholars who have held this view include Marcus Garvey, George James, Cheikh Anta Diop, Martin Bernal, Ivan van Sertima, John Henrik Clarke, Chancellor Williams, and Molefi Kete Asante. The claim has also been made by many Afrocentric scholars that the Ancient Egyptians themselves were Black African (sub-saharan African) rather than North African/Maghrebi, and that the various invasions on Egypt resulted in the "Africanity" of Ancient Egypt becoming diluted, resulting in the modern diversity seen today. Examining this view, Egyptologist Stuart Tyson Smith, wrote that "Any characterization of race of the ancient Egyptians depends on modern cultural definitions, not on scientific study. Thus, by modern American standards it is reasonable to characterise the Egyptians as 'black', while acknowledging the scientific evidence for the physical diversity of Africans". Smith, however, expressed criticism of Egyptologists and Afrocentrists that defined ancient Egyptians "as members of an essentialist racial category" with perceived "Caucasoid" or "Negroid/Africoid" phenotypes".

As historian Ronald H. Fritze argued, mainstream Egyptologists and other scholars strongly object to Afrocentric Egyptology, viewing it as "theurapetic mythology" for black people, since it fails to provide sufficient evidence or persuasive interpretations to back up its claims.

Stephen Howe, professor in the history and cultures of colonialism at Bristol University, writes that contrary to "Afrocentric speculation, depending on undocumented assertions that the relatively light-skinned people of the lower Nile today descend from Arab conquerors rather than earlier residents". Howe also cited a 1995 publication which stated "the latest major synthetic work on African populations is firmly of the opinion that "It was not the Arabs physically displaced Egyptians. Instead the Egyptians were transformed by relatively small number of immigrants bringing in new ideas, which, when disseminated, created a wider ethnic identity".

S.O.Y. Keita, a biological anthropologist and research affilitate at the Smithsonian Institution who has been described as sympathetic to Afrocentrism, but defined his position as that "it is not a question of “African” “influence”; Ancient Egypt was organically African. Studying early Egypt in its African context is not “Afrocentric,” but simply correct". Keita has argued that the original inhabitants of the Nile Valley were primarily a variety of indigenous Northeast Africans from the areas of the desiccating Sahara and more southerly areas. He reviewed studies on the biological affinities of the Ancient Egyptian population and described the skeletal morphologies of early dynastic Egyptian remains as a "Saharo-tropical African variant". He also noted that over time gene flow from the Near East and Europe added more genetic variability to the region. In 2022, Keita argued that some genetic studies have a "default racialist or racist approach" and should be interpreted in a framework with other sources of evidence. Several other academics, including Christopher Ehret, Fekri Hassan, 
Bruce Williams, Frank Yurco, Molefi Kete Asante, Lanny Bell and A.J. Boyce across various disciplines have contended that Ancient Egypt was fundamentally an African civilization, with cultural and biological connections to Egypt's African neighbors.

Scholars have challenged the various assertions of Afrocentrists on the cultural and biological characteristics of Ancient Egyptian civilization and its people. At a UNESCO Symposium in the 1970s, some of the participants, including Jean Vercoutter, Serge Sauneron, Gunnar Säve-Söderbergh and Jean Leclant expressed "profound" disagreement with the "Black", homogeneous hypothesis. Despite contestations, UNESCO decided to include his "Origin of the ancient Egyptians" in the General History of Africa, with an editorial comment mentioning the disagreement. However, Diop's chapter was credited as a "painstakingly researched contribution" in the general conclusion of the symposium report by the International Scientific Committee's Rapporteur, Professor Jean Devisse, which nevertheless lead to a "real lack of balance" in the discussion among participants. The ancient world did not employ racial categories such as "Black" or "White" as they had no conception of "race", but rather labeled groups according to their land of origin and cultural traits. However, Keita studying the controversy, finds simplistic political appellations (in the negative or affirmative) describing ancient populations as "black" or "white" to be inaccurate and instead focuses on the ancestry of ancient Egypt as being a part of the native and diverse biological variation of Africa, which includes a variety of phenotypes and skin gradients.

Egyptian Egyptologist Zahi Hawass has gone on record as saying that the Ancient Egyptians were not black and “We believe that the origin of Ancient Egyptians was purely Egyptian based on the discovery made by British Egyptologist Flinders Petrie at Naqada, and this is why the Ancient Egyptian civilisation did not occur in Africa, it occurred only here”. In 2022, Hawass reiterated his view that "Africans have nothing to do with the pyramids scientifically" and stated that Africans "ruled in Egyptin the late Era, at the time of the 25th dynasty". Hawass also accused some international figures of African descent that promoted Afrocentrism of racism and fabrication of Egyptian history.

In 2008, Stuart Tyson Smith expressed criticism of a facial reconstruction of Tutankhamun as "very light-skinned" which reflected "bias" and "predictably and justifiably, it has provoked protests from Afrocentrists" as "Egyptologists have been strangely reluctant to admit that the ancient Egyptians were rather dark-skinned Africans, especially the farther south one goes".

In 2011, Stephen Quirke, professor of Egyptian Archaeology and Philology argued that the UNESCO-sponsored conference on the General History of Africa in 1974 "did not change the Eurocentric climate of research" and of the need to incorporate both African-centred studies and White European, academic perspectives. He later outlined that "research conferences and publications on the history and language of Kemet [Egypt] remain dominated ... by those brought up and trained in European, not African societies and languages (which include Arabic)".

African-American Afrocentric "hoteps" and the far-right 

African-Americans who use the Black Egyptian hypothesis as a source of black pride have been called "the hoteps" (after the Egyptian word hotep). The term has often been used disparagingly by non-hotep African-Americans, some of whom have linked the ideology of the hotep community – which is anti-feminist, anti-gay and anti-Semitic – to the far-right. Hoteps have been described as promoting false histories and misinformation about black people and black history. Some have argued hotep beliefs are too narrow-minded (focusing only on Egypt as opposed to other aspects of African history), and black feminists argue that hoteps perpetuate rape culture by policing women's sexuality and not criticizing predatory black men.

Others
Within Afrocentrism, claims have been forwarded involving the contention that African civilizations were founding influences on such distant civilizations as the American Olmec and the Chinese Xia cultures.

Reception

Afrocentrism has encountered significant opposition from mainstream scholars who charge it with historical inaccuracy, scholarly ineptitude, and racism.

Yaacov Shavit, a critic of the movement, summarises its goals in the preface to his book History in Black, in which he states:

Other critics, such as Mary Lefkowitz, contend that the Afrocentric historical approach is entrenched in myth and fantasy. She argues that Afrocentrism is grounded in identity politics and myth rather than sound scholarship. In The Skeptic's Dictionary, philosophy professor Robert Todd Carroll labeled Afrocentrism "pseudohistorical". He argued that Afrocentrism's prime goal was to encourage black nationalism and ethnic pride in order to effectively combat the destructive consequences of cultural and universal racism. Professor of history Clarence E. Walker has described Afrocentrism as "a mythology that is racist, reactionary, essentially therapeutic and is eurocentrism in black face."

Classicist Mary Lefkowitz rejects George James's theories about Egyptian contributions to Greek civilization as being faulty scholarship. She writes that ancient Egyptian texts show little similarity to Greek philosophy. Lefkowitz states that Aristotle could not have stolen his ideas from the great Library at Alexandria as James suggested, because the library was founded after Aristotle's death. On the basis of such errors, Lefkowitz calls Afrocentrism "an excuse to teach myth as history." Mary Lefkowitz in 1997 whilst criticising elements of Afrocentrism had acknowledged that the origins of the ancient Egyptians were more clear due to the "recent evidence on skeletons and DNA [which] suggests that the people who settled in the Nile valley, like all of humankind, came from somewhere south of the Sahara; they were not (as some nineteenth-century scholars had supposed) invaders from the North".

In 2002, Ibrahim Sundiata wrote in the American Historical Review that:

Literature and languages scholar Cain Hope Felder, a supporter of Afrocentric ideas, has warned Afrocentrists to avoid certain pitfalls, including:
 Demonizing categorically all white people, without careful differentiation between persons of goodwill and those who consciously perpetuate racism.
 Adopting multiculturalism as a curricular alternative that eliminates, marginalizes, or vilifies European heritage to the point that Europe epitomizes all the evil in the world.
 Gross over-generalizations and using factually or incorrect material is bad history and bad scholarship.

Nathan Glazer writes that although Afrocentricity can mean many things, the popular press has generally given most attention to its most outlandish theories. Glazer agrees with many of the findings and conclusions presented in Lefkowitz's book Not Out of Africa. Yet he also argues that Afrocentrism often presents legitimate and relevant scholarship. The late Manning Marable was also a critic of Afrocentrism. He wrote:

Some Afrocentrists agree in rejecting those works which critics have characterized as examples of bad scholarship. Adisa A. Alkebulan states that the work of Afrocentric scholars is not fully appreciated because critics use the claims of "a few non-Afrocentrists" as "an indictment against Afrocentricity."

In 1996, the historian August Meier critically reviewed the new work of Mary Lefkowitz on Afrocentrism as "Eurocentric". He criticized her book Not out of Africa: How Afrocentrism became an Excuse to Teach Myth as History for what he saw as her neglect of the African-American historic literature of the 19th and 20th centuries. Meier believes she fails to take the African-American experiences into account, to the extent that she "fails to answer the question raised in this book's subtitle".

Maghan Keita describes the controversy over Afrocentrism as a cultural war. He believes certain "epistemologies" are warring with each other: the "epistemology of blackness" argues for the "responsibilities and potential of black peoples to function in and contribute to the progress of civilization."

List of prominent authors

 Marimba Ani, professor, author and activist: Yurugu: An Afrikan-centered Critique of European Cultural Thought and Behavior (Trenton: Africa World Press, 1994).
 Molefi Kete Asante, professor, author: Afrocentricity: The Theory of Social Change; The Afrocentric Idea; The Egyptian Philosophers: Ancient African Voices from Imhotep to Akhenaten
 Jacob Carruthers, Egyptologist; founding director of the Association for the Study of Classical African Civilization; founder and director of the Kemetic Institute, Chicago
 Cheikh Anta Diop, author: The African Origin of Civilization: Myth or Reality; Civilization or Barbarism: An Authentic Anthropology; Precolonial Black Africa; The Cultural Unity of Black Africa: The Domains of Patriarchy and of Matriarchy in Classical Antiquity; The Peopling of Ancient Egypt & the Deciphering of the Meroitic Script
 Yosef Ben-Jochannan, author: African Origins of Major "Western Religions"; Black Man of the Nile and His Family; Africa: Mother of Western Civilization; New Dimensions in African History; The Myth of Exodus and Genesis and the Exclusion of Their African Origins; Africa: Mother of Western Civilization; Abu Simbel to Ghizeh: A Guide Book and Manual
  The protagonist of this novel describes her ongoing daily experiences in the US using a consistently Afrocentric perspective.
 Runoko Rashidi, author: Introduction to African Civilizations; The global African community: The African presence in Asia, Australia, and the South Pacific
 J.A. Rogers, author: Sex and Race: Negro-Caucasian Mixing in All Ages and All Lands: The Old World; Nature Knows No Color Line; Sex and Race: A History of White, Negro, and Indian Miscegenation in the Two Americas: The New World; 100 Amazing Facts About the Negro With Complete Proof: A Short Cut to the World History of the Negro
 Ivan van Sertima, author: They Came before Columbus: The African Presence in Ancient America, African Presence in Early Europe  ; Blacks in Science Ancient and Modern; African Presence in Early Asia; African Presence in Early America; Early America Revisited; Egypt Revisited: Journal of African Civilizations; Nile Valley Civilizations; Egypt: Child of Africa (Journal of African Civilizations, V. 12); The Golden Age of the Moor (Journal of African Civilizations, Vol. 11, Fall 1991); Great Black Leaders: Ancient and Modern; Great African Thinkers: Cheikh Anta Diop
 Chancellor Williams, author: The Destruction of Black Civilization: Great Issues of a Race from 4500 B.C. to 2000 A.D.
 Théophile Obenga, author: Ancient Egypt and Black Africa: a student's handbook for the study of Ancient Egypt in philosophy, linguistics, and gender relations
 Asa Hilliard, III, author: SBA: The Reawakening of the African Mind; The Teachings of Ptahhotep

See also

 African-American culture
 African philosophy
 African Renaissance
 Anti-Europeanism
 Americentrism
 Asiacentrism
 Black orientalism
 Black supremacy
 Ethnocentrism
 Nationalism and archaeology
 Négritude
 Nuwaubian Nation
 Pseudohistory
 Race and ethnicity in the United States
 Reverse discrimination

References

Literature

Primary
 
 
 
 
Asante, Molefi Kete (2007). An Afrocentric Manifesto. Cambridge: Polity Press.

Secondary
 Adeleke, Tunde. (2009). The Case Against Afrocentrism. University Press of Mississippi.  

 
 
 
 
 
 
 Konstan, David. "Inventing Ancient Greece: [Review article]", History and Theory, Vol. 36, No. 2. (May 1997), pp. 261–269.

External links

Afrocentricity by Molefi Kete Asante, asante.net
"The Afrocentric Hustle" Stanley Crouch comments on the emergence of Afrocentric thought in the African American community.
Afrocentrism: The Argument We're Really Having by Ibrahim Sundiata
ankhonline.com

 
African-American culture
Black Power
Ethnocentrism
Geocultural perspectives
Pan-Africanism
Political neologisms
Pseudohistory
Historical revisionism
African-American-related controversies